Polyvinyl fluoride (PVF) or –(CH2CHF)n– is a polymer material mainly used in the flammability-lowering coatings of airplane interiors and photovoltaic module backsheets. It is also used in raincoats and metal sheeting. Polyvinyl fluoride is a thermoplastic fluoropolymer with a repeating vinyl fluoride unit, and it is structurally very similar to polyvinyl chloride.

PVF has low permeability for vapors, burns very slowly, and has excellent resistance to weathering and staining. It is also resistant to most chemicals, except ketones and esters. It is available as a film in a variety of colors and formulations for various end uses, and as a resin for specialty coatings. It has insufficient thermal stability for injection moulding and thus it is usually available commercially as a film product.

PVF is also used as whiteboard surface material and has recently been used as part of the Phoenix Mars Lander's biobarrier.

Related compounds
Vinyl fluoride
PVC (polyvinyl chloride)
PVDF (polyvinylidene fluoride)
PTFE (polytetrafluoroethylene or Teflon)

References

External links
polyvinyl fluoride (PVF)
Fluoropolymers
Plastics
Thermoplastics
Airship technology
Vinyl polymers